William McCreery Ramsey (17 April 1931 – 2 July 2021) was an American-German jazz and pop singer, journalist and actor famous for his German-language hits. He returned to Germany a year after he had served compulsory military service with the U.S. Air Force there. Active as a singer of jazz and pop already as a soldier, he made a career in different fields of musical entertainment. He sang and recorded German schlager, also German-language cover versions of English hits, jazz and swing. He appeared in films and television series, and ran popular series on radio and television as presenter.

Biography 
William McCreery Ramsey, called Bill, was born in Cincinnati, Ohio, the son of a teacher and an advertising manager for Procter & Gamble. In his youth, he sang in a college dance band. He began to study sociology and business from 1949 to 1951 at Yale University in New Haven and sang jazz, swing and blues in the evenings. His greatest influences were Count Basie, Nat King Cole, Duke Ellington and Louis Jordan. Due to the Korean War, compulsory military service was again introduced in the US and Ramsey served with the U.S. Air Force in Germany. He was discovered by an employee of the American Forces Network (AFN), and hired to entertain troops. There Ramsey advanced to executive producer and though still in service, spent more time on appearances at festivals. As of 1953, he appeared with, among others, band leaders Ernst Mosch, Paul Kuhn, Kurt Edelhagen and James Last. The jazz pianist and music producer  organized an appearance with Hessischer Rundfunk for Ramsey in 1955. There he did playback recordings for the musical film  (Love, dance and 1000 hits) with Peter Alexander and Caterina Valente. Upon his discharge from the military in 1957, he continued his studies in the U.S. and returned to Frankfurt a year later.

Gietz took Ramsey under contract in 1958 and in the same year his first single with Polydor was released. It was a small but respectable success and launched the style, with which ”the man with the black voice” would land hits in the future. The music was oriented on the Anglo American pop music hits of that period. Among Ramsey's hits published in the 1950s and 1960s were German-language cover versions of Hank Ballard, The Beatles, Fats Domino, Ivory Joe Hunter, Roger Miller, Elvis Presley, Jimmie Rodgers, Andy Williams, Sheb Wooley and others. In addition, he performed numerous originals, which were composed almost exclusively by Gietz. The ironic lyrics of Kurt Feltz and  often commented on current events.

Ramsey and Gietz signed with Columbia label EMI Group in 1962, where they would continue their success. As beat music changed the market in the 1960s, Ramsey was a regular on the German charts. In the second half of the 1960s Ramsey took up predominantly English-language songs and dedicated himself again to jazz and blues. In this musically varied decade he presented operettas, musical and beat songs, as well as an LP with children's songs. Ramsey switched labels to Gietz's record company Cornet in 1966, and later in the same year to Polydor. He appeared on different labels in the 1970s. 

Ramsey appeared regularly as a pop and jazz singer, mostly in duets with the guitarist Juraj Galan, with whom he released several albums. The duo's LP Live in the House of Commons won the German record critics prize. From the late 1980s, Ramsey presented Swingtime each Friday on Hessischer Rundfunk until 2019. In 2008 and 2009 he went on tour with Max Greger and Hugo Strasser as Swing legends.

He was a  lecturer for many years at Hamburg University for Music and Performing Arts. He had a lead speaking role in the audio play for children Der kleine Tag in 1999.

Television 
His popularity led to numerous appearances in film and television, where he appeared as a singer and in comedy roles. Ramsey had numerous television appearances, acted in 28 films and toured through Europe, the US, and North Africa.

Personal 
Ramsey lived for 20 years in Zürich, later in Wiesbaden, and from 1991 onward with his fourth wife Petra in Hamburg. He became a German citizen on 17 October 1984. His wife, a physician, also worked as his manager.

Ramsey died at his home in Hamburg at the age of 90 on 2 July 2021.

Discography (selection) 
Ramsey released 50 singles as well as 30 LPs and CDs, including:

Singles

EPs 
 Go Man Go / Hier könn' Matrosen vor Anker geh'n / Souvenirs / Mach keinen Heck-Meck (1959; Polydor)
 Pigalle / Missouri Cowboy / Bist du einsam heut' Nacht / Immer zieht es mich zu ihr (with Peter Alexander) (1961; Polydor)
 Paul Abraham's Viktoria und ihr Husar (with Sonja Knittel, Sari Barabas, Conny Froboess, Jacqueline Boyer, Willy Hagara, Heinz Hoppe, Harry Friedauer, Rex Gildo, Paul Kuhn and the Botho-Lucas-Chor) (c. 1964; Electrola)
 My Fair Lady / Kiss Me, Kate (with Rex Gildo, Gitte, Willy Hagara, Ralf Bendix, Paul Kuhn and the Botho-Lucas-Chor) (1964; Electrola)

LPs 
 William "Big Bill" Ramsey, Jazz Festival Sopot 1957 (with Riverside Syncopators Jazz-Band, Milano) (c. 1957; Muza)
 Die Blume von Hawaii / Viktoria und ihr Husar (with Peter Alexander, Rita Bartos, Margot Eskens, Franz Fehringer, Willy Hofmann, Margrit Imlau, Bibi Johns, Sándor Kónya, Willy Schneider and Herta Talmar) (c. 1961; Polydor)
 Evergreens aus dem Schlagerkeller (with Ralf Bendix, Chris Howland and Dany Mann) (1962; Electrola)
 Die Blume von Hawaii / Viktoria und ihr Husar (with Sonja Knittel, Sari Barabas, Conny Froboess, Jacqueline Boyer, Willy Hagara, Heinz Hoppe, Harry Friedauer, Rex Gildo, Paul Kuhn and the Botho-Lucas-Chor) (c. 1964; Electrola)
 Bill Ramsey's Schlagerparty (1964; Electrola)
 Sing ein Lied mit Onkel Bill / Kinderparty bei Bill Ramsey (children's party with Bill Ramsey, with Conny Froboess, Paul Kuhn, Ralf Paulsen and the Westfälische Nachtigallen) (1965; Electrola)
 Bill Ramsey singt Lieder seiner Heimat (Songs from Home) (1965; Electrola)
 Ballads & Blues (with Paul Kuhn) (1965; Electrola)
 Got A New Direction (& The Jay Five) (1966; Cornet)
 Sei mein Freund (Be my friend, 1972; Columbia)
 Hard Travelling (with Don Paulin) (1975; Warner Bros.)
 Die andere Seite – Dedicated to Nat King Cole (The other side, c. 1977; Polydor)
 On the Spot (with Dieter Reith, Matts Björklund, Jimmy Patrick, Dave King and Keith Forsey) (c. 1977; Polydor [?])
 Rückfall (1990; Papagayo)

CDs 
 Caldonia and more ... (Bear Family Records), including recordings from 1957, 1966 and 1980
 Souvenirs (1992; Bear Family Records), including recordings from 1958 to 1961
 Ohne Krimi geht die Mimi nie ins Bett (1994; Bear Family Records), including recordings from 1962 to 1965
 Ballads And Blues / Songs From Home (Bear Family Records), including recordings from 1965
 The Other Side – A Dedication to Nat King Cole (Bear Family Records), including recordings from 1975 to 1977
 On the Spot (Bear Family Records), including recordings from 1977
 When I See You (with Toots Thielemans), Bell Records), including recordings from 1979 to 1980
 Underneath the Apple Tree (with Juraj Galan, Tyrostar), including recordings from 1983 to 1984
 Rückfall (1990; Papagayo)
 Getting' Back To Swing (with the SDR Big Band, conducted by Dieter Reith, 1994; Bear Family Records)
 Hamburg, keine ist wie du (1999; Bear Family Records)
 Ballads, Streets & Blues (with Peter Weniger and the Achim-Kück-Trio, 2001; Mons Records)
 Big Band Boogie (with the Thilo Wolf Big Band, 2002; Mons Records)
 Send In The Clowns (with Jean-Louis Rassinfosse, 005; Swingland Records)
 Here's To Life – Here's To Joe (with the hr-Bigband, conducted by Jörg Achim Keller, 2006; HR-Musik)

Films 
Ramsey appeared in 28 feature films, including:

 1955: Music in the Blood (Musik im Blut), a Kurt Widmann biography
 1955: 
 1959: Kein Mann zum Heiraten
 1961: 
 1961: 
 1961: Our Crazy Aunts (Unsere tollen Tanten)
 1961: 
 1961: 

 1961: 
 1961: The Adventures of Count Bobby (Die Abenteuer des Grafen Bobby)
 1962: 
 1962: Between Shanghai and St. Pauli (Zwischen Schanghai und St. Pauli)
 1962: The Sweet Life of Count Bobby (Das süsse Leben des Grafen Bobby)
 1962: Café Oriental

 1963: Homesick for St. Pauli (Heimweh nach St. Pauli)
 1963: 
 1964: 
 1964: Old Shatterhand
 1971: 
 1978: The Swissmakers (Die Schweizermacher)
 1990: Peter in Magicland (Peterchens Mondfahrt)
 1993: Almenrausch und Pulverschnee (TV series)
 1997:  (TV)

Awards
 Order of Merit of the Federal Republic of Germany

References

External links 

 Official Website
 

1931 births
2021 deaths
American expatriates in Germany
American emigrants to Germany
American male singers
American male actors
American male journalists
Recipients of the Cross of the Order of Merit of the Federal Republic of Germany
Hessischer Rundfunk people
Naturalized citizens of Germany
 Yale University alumni
 United States Air Force airmen
 Musicians from Cincinnati